The Queen's Head is a pub in Bramfield, Suffolk, England. The pub was formerly known as the "Skeltons". It is a Grade II listed building, which dates back in part to the 1540s.

It is 15 minutes from the coastal town of Southwold, and is in the centre of the village of Bramfield, Suffolk. It has excellent views of St. Andrew's Church from the landscaped gardens. St. Andrew's Church is home to the only detached round bell tower in Suffolk, and also faces the side of Bramfield Hall, where excellent examples of crinkle crankle walls can be found.

The pub has received recognition for its food. It won The Good Food Guide pub of the year twice in a row and was in The Good Pub Guide, The Good Food Guide, AA Pub Guide and Michelin Guide to Eating Out in Pubs in 2008.
After 30 years of ownership, the pub was sold in late 2015 by Adnams PLC to property developers, Barsham Securities Limited, who refurbished the building and modernised the kitchen before leasing to a new tenant.

The pub was taken over in 2018 by the Wood family, and continues to this day to offer high quality pub dining, alongside events such as an annual beer festival, food themed evenings and more. Following a bout of closures due to COVID-19, the pub continues to thrive and remains a popular destination for those visiting the local area, as well as local trade.

References

External links

Official website

Grade II listed pubs in Suffolk
Timber framed buildings in Suffolk